Jaclyn Joshua Thanaraj Victor (born 4 December 1978) is a Malaysian singer, songwriter, actress & businesswoman who won the inaugural Malaysian Idol, Ikon Malaysia & Gegar Vaganza Season 9. As the winner of Malaysian Idol, she won a recording contract with Sony BMG Music Entertainment. She represented Malaysia in the first Asian Idol & Ikon Asean. She has been dubbed "Asia's Divette" for her vocal prowess and a legend in Malaysia.

Jaclyn Victor is known for her Malay-language hits such as Gemilang, Di Pohon Asmara, Wajah, Cepat - Cepat, Ceritara Cinta, Satu Harapan, Bertamu Di Kalbu, Beribu Sesalan, Jagalah Diri, Ikut Rentaku, Seindah Mimpi and Nisan Cinta.

Her debut album "Gemilang" under the label Sony BMG won the "Best Pop Album" & "Album of the Year" awards in Anugerah Industri Muzik 2005, while the title track won main prize at Anugerah Juara Lagu in 2005.

In 2012, Jaclyn Victor signed a recording deal with KRU Music & released an album entitled "Ikut Rentakku". After winning a number of awards, she signed a new agreement with KRU Music and released an English language EP entitled "Unleashed" in 2014.

At the 2017 Anugerah Juara Lagu, Jaclyn performed as an Opening Act & she performed as a finalist for the 6th time at the Anugerah Juara Lagu 2019. Jaclyn Victor also performed at the 2021 AJL with Faizal Tahir, Tuju K-Clique & Siti Nordiana premiering their collaboration song titled "#BaikSemula" for Covid-19 pandemic.  

Jaclyn performed at the 2017 SEA Games for the second time after the 2011 ceremony. In early 2018, she received the Anugerah Ikon Muzik (Music Icon award).

In August 2022, Jaclyn Victor officially released a new single "Perempuan" under new label "Alternate Records & Talents". Jaclyn joined the season 9 of Gegar Vaganza & declared as the champion in November 2022.

As of 2022, Jaclyn has won total of 10 Anugerah Industry Muzik (Malaysia's equivalent of the Grammy awards) & she has won total of 5 awards in various categories at Anugerah Juara Lagu thus making her one of the most acclaimed and successful artists in Malaysia. Jaclyn Victor is also a businesswoman as she owns a bar/restaurant at Kuala Lumpur.

Biography and music career

Early life
Jaclyn was born in Kepong, Kuala Lumpur, on 4 December 1978. She is the only daughter of Maggie Victor, a single mother of Tamil Indian descent. Jaclyn's father died when she was nine years old, prompting her mother to take on three jobs simultaneously to support her and her three younger brothers. At the age of eighteen, Jaclyn started singing in clubs and hotel lounges.

With the support of friends and family, Jaclyn and her friend, Ravi Sivalingam a.k.a. Ravi the Rat, recorded an album, titled "Dream". This album was produced and written by Ravi Sivalingam and co written by Jaclyn. There were attempts to promote this album including an appearance on the 8TV television show Latte @ 8.

Malaysian Idol
In 2004, her mother encouraged her to audition for Malaysian Idol, which she did along with ten thousand others. The judges Roslan Aziz, Fauziah Latiff and Paul Moss, put her through to the next round. Having secured a final thirty-third spot, Jaclyn performed "Superwoman" live, becoming the seventh person to reach the top twelve.

In the first spectacular show, the theme for the week was "Song from your Pop Idol". Jaclyn choose a song by the Indonesian diva Ruth Sahanaya, "Keliru". Coached by Aubrey Suwito, Juwita Suwito along with Elaine Pedley, her performance took her through to the next round. The second theme was "Song from your Classic Idol". Jaclyn's choice was "When I Fall in Love" and Michael Xavier Voon joined in as performance coach. Her performance gained resounding praise. After another double elimination sending off Fahmy and Rydee, Jaclyn was back the following week performing a "Song from the 80s", Chaka Khan's "I Feel For You". She went on to the "Rock Show" with a performance of "Sweet Child O' Mine".

The last six contestants included Nikki, Dina, Vick, Andrew and Saipul. Jaclyn performed an effortless "Lady Marmalade", but received a less favourable comment from Roslan, who said that "she is a super singer but not an idol", and he felt bored week by week of her performances thus far. On the results show, she found herself in the bottom two for the first time (with Nikki, who performed "Emotion"), but she survived the elimination. After reaching the last three, her chances were improved by her performance of Alicia Keys' "If I Ain't Got You".

Jaclyn had become one of the final two contestants on Malaysian Idol, and on 9 October 2004, she took the title with 76% of audience votes over Dina. In tears, Jaclyn performed the ballad "Gemilang" (Glory), the song written for the winner of Malaysian Idol, which subsequently appeared on her first album Gemilang. The song's music video incorporated short scenes of Jaclyn in Malaysian Idol.

Post Idol career
Jaclyn's album achieved gold status within weeks of going on sale. Her previously released album Dream, sold out within days, despite the sudden increase in price. She won the "Best Newcomer Award" on Hitz. FM and "Best New Artist" in Anugerah Bintang Popular.

Jaclyn has since appeared in numerous television and talk shows such as Pillow Talk and Muzik-Muzik. She has also performed "Gemilang" at a tsunami concert held to aid victims of the 2004 Indian Ocean earthquake. She has performed in duets with Hazami, Taufik Batisah, Akademi Fantasia's second winner, Zahid, Delon Thamrin and Misha Omar, and has performed and recorded with international singers such as Peabo Bryson, Ramin Karimloo, Simon Bailey and Az Yet.

Jaclyn received her first international award when she won gold at the Asia New Singer Competition at the Shanghai Music Festival in China on 28 October 2005, emerging as the champion with her winning song, "Gemilang". On 21 January 2006, she received RTM Hits 1 Best Song and Best Performance awards for "Gemilang". On 5 February the same year, the song earned her and its composer Aubrey Suwito and lyricist Azmin Mudin the "Juara Lagu" (Champion of Songs) and "Best Ballad Song" awards in TV3's 20th edition of the Anugerah Juara Lagu. She was expected to win the TV3's "Anugerah Vokal Terbaik" (Best Vocal Award) but was beaten by Hazami who performed "Kata". Jaclyn took the Best Female Artiste award at the Anugerah Planet Muzik (Music Planet Awards) in Singapore on 24 March.

On 29 April 2006, Victor won four of seven nominations from the Malaysian music scene's biggest night, the 13th Anugerah Industri Muzik. They were Best New Artist, Best Musical Arrangement in a Song, Best Pop Album and Best Album.

After a series of delays, Jaclyn's second album, Inilah Jac, was released on 25 August 2006, while she was on a trip to Australia for both leisure and business purposes, including visiting Mount Buller and performing in two concerts in Melbourne's Australia for Christ Fellowship Church (with the singer-songwriter Juwita Suwito), and in Adelaide's Paradise Community Church (of which the inaugural Australian Idol winner, the Malaysian-born Guy Sebastian is a member, though Sebastian himself did not appear). While in Australia, Jaclyn also did an interview for the Christian radio station HCJB.

In November 2006, she made her first proper music video (previously her videos were clips from studio recording sessions or footage from Malaysian Idol) when she filmed "Ceritera Cinta" with the male crooner Rio Febrian in his homeland in Indonesia.

2007 was a very busy year for Jaclyn. She competed in the Ikon Malaysia 2007 (solo category) competition, getting to the final round with Dayang Nurfaizah and Mawi. In the final, she sang a medley of songs: "Impian" (hope) from her first album, "Cepat-cepat" from her second album and "Gemilang", to win the title.

Later that year, she competed in Ikon Asean and was defeated by the Philippines' Vina Morales. She also participated in the first Asian Idol which was won by Hady Mirza of Singapore Idol.

At the 14th Anugerah Industri Muzik (AIM) Malaysia, on 28 April 2007, Jaclyn was nominated for four awards – Best Vocal Performance in an Album – Female; Best Music Arrangement in a song – Inilah Masanya; Best Pop Album – Inilah Jac; Ceritera Cinta – Song of the year.  She won the "Best Female Vocal Performance in an Album" award. She also received two APM nominations, all of which are attributed to Inilah Jac.

Jaclyn's music was used on the Special Edition of Disney studio's High School Musical 2 soundtrack. She sang the duet "You Are The Music in Me" in both English and Bahasa Malaysia with Vince Chong, the season 1 winner of another singing reality-TV program, Akademi Fantasia. A music video and nationwide mall tour followed for fans of the High School Musical franchise. The video of their version of the song is now on the Special Edition DVD of High School Musical 2 (2008).

As part of the year-long "50 Years of Malaysian Independence" celebrations, Jaclyn was part of the "Live and Loud KL" concert series which featured international and local artists. This 10-day music extravaganza included a wide range of genres and more than fifty performers, with more than 45 hours of live music. The festival was held from 23 November until 2 December, with each day giving festival-goers a different genre, a different theme, a different repertoire, a different venue and different stars, including Whitney Houston, Elliott Yamin, Shaggy, Project Pop, James Taylor Quartet, Joe Flizzow and Hannah Tan.

Before Christmas 2007, Jaclyn flew to Moscow for a charity Christmas concert named Christmas Bash 2007, co-organized by the Sechenov Malaysian Student Association and Malaysian Fellowship Moscow after an invitation by the organising committee. The concert was attended by almost a thousand people, the majority of them being Malaysian Medical Students studying in Moscow. She also performed during the 8TV's fourth birthday party in January 2008.

On 27 January 2008, the finals of the annual Anugerah Juara Lagu were held in Kuala Lumpur. After a difficult competition, Jaclyn won the Best Vocal Award with Lah from VE for their rendition of Jaclyn's duet "Ceritera Cinta" (originally with the Indonesian singer, Rio Febrian). The song is on Victor's second Sony BMG album, Inilah Jac.

Two of her songs have been used as opening themes for Malaysian television series, "Cepat-Cepat" for sitcom Fara and "Satu Harapan" for the TV drama Manjalara.

In 2009, Jaclyn Victor released her third official album entitled "Jaclyn Victor III".

2010 - 2019
In 2011, she released a collaborative album with Ning Baizura and Shila Amzah entitled "3 Suara", they won "Best Vocal in a Song" at the 18th Anugerah Industri Muzik and "Most Popular Group" in "Anugerah Bintang Popular 2011".

In 2012, Jaclyn Victor won three Anugerah Industri Muzik awards for the song "Counting days" with Aubrey Suwito. She also joined another singing competition hosted by Astro called Mania in 2012 battling several other Malaysian singers & as emerged as a top 3 finalist.

Jaclyn wanted a change in her musical direction and in 2012, she signed a recording agreement with "KRU Music", a progressive independent label. Through this label, Jaclyn Victor released 3 successful singles namely "Sebelah Jiwaku", "Jagalah Diri" and "Ikut Rentakku", produced and written by Malaysia's prolific singer-songwriter-producer Edry Abdul Halim. In early of 2014, once again Jaclyn Victor won for The Best Vocal in Anugerah Juara Lagu 28 through her song, Ikut Rentakku beating other performers including Azlan & The Typewriter and Hafiz Suip.She recorded a rock track "Shine" with Beat The System and won VIMA Song of the Year.

In July 2014, Victor continued her contract with KRU Music and released her English EP entitled "Unleashed" in September 2014. Jaclyn promoted the album in Los Angeles in a one-week tour, performing live shows and attending TV and radio interviews. She performed in Istana Budaya for a James Bond musical tribute entitled The Licence To Thrill: A Bond Concert in September 2014. The concert features West End stars David Shannon and Simon Bailey and local singers, Salamiah Hassan and Nikki Palikat.

In 2015, Jaclyn Victor released the Malay version of her song "Sweeter than a dream" entitled "Seindah Mimpi" as a single. In early 2016, she performed as a guest artist in Stadium Negara alongside Siti Nurhaliza for her concert, Dato' Siti Nurhaliza & Friends Concert, as a celebration of the latter 20th anniversary in music industry.

In early 2017, Jaclyn performed at the Anugerah Juara Lagu as an Opening Act. In summer 2017, she released a collaborative song with Siti Nordiana titled "Nisan Cinta" and another collaborative song with Hafiz Quip titled "Aku Negaraku" as a Merdeka song. Victor performed at the 2017 SEA Games after two days of giving birth to her second child.

In early 2018, Jaclyn Victor received an Anugerah Ikon Muzik (Music Icon award). In August 2018, she appeared as a guest judge and also performed at the Big Stage 2018 organized by Astro. Jaclyn performed the iconic Bohemian Rhapsody song with finalist Pasya at the Grand Finale of Mentor 7 in December 2018.

In early 2019, Jaclyn Victor competed as a finalist for the 6th time at Anugerah Juara Lagu through the song Nisan Cinta with Siti Nordiana. She also did an opening performance at the 30th Festival Filem Malaysia. In April 2019, Jaclyn released a collaborative song titled "Keep Flying" with Sasi The don, Caprice and Alvin Chong for Malaysian Airlines.

2020 - Present
In early 2021, Jaclyn released a collaboration song with Faizal Tahir, Tuju K-Clique and Siti Nordiana titled " #BaikSemula " for Covid-19 pandemic & made a special performance at Anugerah Juara Lagu.

In August 2022, Jaclyn Victor officially released a new single "Perempuan" under new label "Alternate Records & Talents". She also joined the season 9 of Gegar Vaganza & won the competition in November 2022.

Acting career
She starred in the film Talentime, directed by Yasmin Ahmad, in 2009. She received the award for Best Promising Actress at the 22nd Malaysian Film Festival. She was reportedly invited to star in a film by Mamat Khalid but declined. She made a cameo appearance in a local horror film, Susuk. Jaclyn also appeared in a local Tamil film, Appalam which is directed by Afdlin Shauki.

She has also appeared in musical theatre, Cuci The Musical Season 2 in 2010.

Controversy
A song titled "Harapan Bangsa" sung by Jaclyn in 2007 for the churches in Sabah and Sarawak caused controversy in certain sections of the Muslim community, which is predominantly Malay-speaking people in Peninsular Malaysia, when a YouTube clip of the song using Christian images was uploaded five years later by a fan. Perkasa, the infamous non-governmental Malay organisation which was formed in the aftermath of the Malaysian general elections in 2008, has called for a blanket boycott of Jaclyn by Muslims nationwide over the song.

Personal life
On 12 August 2014, Victor officially introduced her husband, an American singer, Shawn Rivera. The couple tied the knot in a Philadelphian church in the United States on 19 July. Together the couple has a son, Jonah Joshiah Rivera, born 24 August 2015. Their second child, a girl, Molly Marguerite Rivera was born 24 August 2017. Rivera announced their divorce on January 11, 2020 via a Facebook posting citing "unable to reconcile our differences".

Filmography

Discography

Studio albums

EPs
Bersama Kamu (2013, KRU Music)
Unleashed (2014, KRU Music) [English EP]

Compilations
Malaysian Idol Karaoke (with Danell Lee) (2005, Karaoke CD/VCD, Sony BMG)
Jubilee (compilation Christian album) (2007, AION Music)
Keunggulan Jaclyn Victor (compilation of her well-known hits) (2011, 2CD/1VCD, Sony Music)
Hits Terbaik - Misha Omar & Jaclyn Victor (2014, Sony Music)

Singles
[Year 2000 - 2009] :

"In a Dream'" (2002, released only in independent music circles)
"Gemilang" (2004)
"Di Bawah Pohon Asmara" (2005)
"Tiada Lagi Indah" (2005)
"Cuma Setia" (2005)
"Wajah" (2005, theme song for Bersamamu TV3)
"Getaran Rinduku" (2005)
"Cinta" (a collaboration with Misha Omar) (2006)
"Cepat Cepat" (2006)
"Ceritera Cinta" (2006, duet with Rio Febrian)
"Without You" (2006, duet with Same Same)
"Ipoh Mali" (a collaboration with Point Blanc) (2007)
"Jealous" (2007)
"Satu Harapan" (2007)
"Cinta Tiada Akhirnya" (2007)
"Kau Muzik di hatiku" (2007, duet with Vince Chong) (OST of High School Musical 2 – Asian edition)
"You're the Music in Me" (2007, duet with Vince Chong) (OST of High School Musical 2 – Asian edition)
"Dambaran Cinta" (2008, theme song for Apa Kata Hati)
"Bertamu Di Kalbu" (2009)
"Cinta Ada" (a collaboration with Dato' Sheila Majid & Karen Kong) (2009)
"Inilah Malaysia" (2009, featuring Arch Little Danielle) (for the Lagu 1Malaysia Kita Song Competition)

[Year 2010 - 2019] :

"Ku Tak Bisa" (2010)
"Di Mana Di Mana" (a collaboration with Ning Baizura and Shila) (2011)
"Beribu Sesalan" (a collaboration with Ning Baizura and Shila) (2011)
"Semua Isi Hatimu" (a collaboration with Ning Baizura and Shila) (2011)
"Shine" (a collaboration with Beat The System) (2012)
"Counting days" (a collaboration with Aubrey Suwito) (2012)
"Sebelah Jiwaku" (first single under the KRU Studios label) (2013)
"Jagalah Diri" (2013)
"Ikut Rentakku" (2014) 
"Remedy" (2014) 
"Seindah Mimpi" (2015) 
"Sweeter than a Dream" (2015)
"Nisan Cinta" (a collaboration with Siti Nordiana) (2017)
"Aku Negaraku" (a collaboration with Hafiz Suip) (2017)
"Perfume" (a collaboration with Martin Looi & Gabriel J) (2018)
"Keep Flying" (2019, a collaboration with Sasi The Don, Caprice & Alvin Chong) (for Malaysian Airlines)
"With A Promise" (2019)
"Aktif Negaraku" (2019, for Milo)

[Year 2020 - Present] :

"Inilah Malaysia" (2020)
" #BaikSemula " (2021, a collaboration with Faizal Tahir, Tuju K-Clique & Siti Nordiana) (for Covid-19)
"Perempuan" (2022)

Music videos

Awards
Anugerah Industri Muzik:

 13th Anugerah Industri Muzik (AIM) Malaysia – 2006
 Best New Artist
 Best Arrangement in a Song
 Best Pop Album
 Album of the Year
 14th Anugerah Industri Muzik (AIM) Malaysia – 2007
 Best Female Vocal Performance in an Album
 Anugerah Industri Muzik 18 – 2011
 Best Vocal in a Song - Beribu Sesalan (With Ning Baizura & Shila Amzah) 
 Anugerah Industri Muzik 19 – 2012
 Best Vocal – Female. Song : "Counting Days" 
 Best Music Arrangement. Song : "Counting Days" by Aubrey Suwito
 Best English Song. Song : "Counting Days" by Aubrey Suwito

Anugerah Juara Lagu:

 TV3 Anugerah Juara Lagu – 2006
 Best Ballad Award – "Gemilang"
 Song of the Year Award – "Gemilang"
 Anugerah Juara Lagu - 2008
 Best Vocal Performance "Ceritera Cinta" (Duet with Lah, from VE)
 Anugerah Juara Lagu 26
 1st Runner-up – Beribu Sesalan (With Ning Baizura & Shila Amzah)
 Anugerah Juara Lagu 28
 Best Vocal – Ikut Rentakku

Anugerah Bintang Popular:

 Anugerah Bintang Popular - 2005
 Most Popular New Female Artist 
 Anugerah Bintang Popular - 2011
 Most Popular Group (With Ning Baizura & Shila Amzah)

Anugerah Planet Muzik:
 Anugerah Planet Muzik (Singapore) – 2006
 Best Female Artist
 Anugerah Planet Muzik - 2011
 Best Vocal Performance in a Group (Collaboration with Ning Baizura & Shila Amzah)

Other Accolades:

 Malaysian Idol - 2004
 Title winner
 Hitz.FM Award - 2005
 Best Newcomer
 Malaysia's Global Chinese Recommended Golden Arts Award (Music Category) – 2005
 XIII Shanghai Asian Music Festival Golden Prize – 2005
 RTM Hits 1 – 2006
 Best Song Award – "Gemilang"
 Best Performance Award
 URS Magazine Award
 Non-Malay glamour artist
 Ikon Malaysia
 Winner of Ikon Malaysia – Solo
 Anugerah Era - 2007
 Chosen Local English Artiste – Ipoh Mali/Point Blanc
 Red Box Karaoke Chart Awards - 2008
 No. 6 – Ceritera Cinta
 Anugerah Skrin - 2009
 Special Jury Award – Anugerah Yasmin Ahmad (Talentime)
 Shout! Awards - 2009
 Power Vocal Award
 Festival Filem Malaysia ke-22
 Most Promising Actress (Talentime)
 Gegar Vaganza Season 9 - 2022
 Winner/Champion

Concerts
 Zoom in with Jaclyn Victor (2005)
 Konsert Fenomena Jaclyn Victor & Misha Omar (2005)
 Sunday Nite Live at Planet Hollywood (2006)
 Zoom in with Jaclyn Victor (2006)
 Konsert Fenomena Jaclyn Victor & Dayang Nurfaizah (2006)
 Down Memory Lane with Jaclyn Victor (2007)
 Malam Gemilang Ekslusif bersama Jaclyn Victor @ Planet Hollywood (2007)
 Hard Rock Cafe's Pinktober LIVE (Special Showcase) [2010]
 WEST END STARS in Concert (with Ramin Karimloo, Simon Bailey & Stephen Rahman Hughes)
 Konsert 3 Permata 2012 @ Esplanade Singapore (with Adibah Noor & Misha Omar)
 Swiss Dream Circus 2018 (with Ayda Jebat)
 PHM 2018 (Unity concert)

References

External links

Complete MP3 Database
The 8 Unit (Management)

1978 births
Living people
Asian Idol
Idols (TV series) winners
Malaysian women pop singers
Malaysian television personalities
Malaysian people of Tamil descent
Malaysian Christians
People from Kuala Lumpur
Tamil singers
Malay-language singers
Malaysian Idol winners
One in a Million (Malaysian TV series)
Malaysian pop rock singers
Malaysian rhythm and blues singers
21st-century Malaysian women singers